Status Minor are a Finnish progressive metal band from Tampere. The group, currently signed with Lion Music, has released 3 full-length albums as of 2017.

History
The group was formed in 2002 by Sami Saarinen. The drummer, Rolf Pilve, also acts as the drummer for Stratovarius, and keyboardist Jukka Karinen is known from Thunderstone.

Members
Markku Kuikka (vocals)
Jukka Karinen (keyboards)
Sami Saarinen (guitars)
Eero Pakkanen (bass)
Rolf Pilve (drums)

Discography
Dialog (2009)
Ouroboros (2012)
Three Faces of Antoine (2017)

External links

http://www.statusminor.com/
http://www.metalfromfinland.com/Status_Minor

Finnish heavy metal musical groups